"Scentless Apprentice" is a song by the American rock band Nirvana, written by vocalist and guitarist Kurt Cobain, drummer Dave Grohl, and bassist Krist Novoselic. It is the second track on their third and final studio album In Utero, released in September 1993.

Origin and recording

Early history
"Scentless Apprentice" was written during a band rehearsal in 1992. Unlike most Nirvana songs, the guitar riff was written by Grohl, rather than Cobain. "It was such a cliché grunge Tad riff that I was reluctant to even jam on it," Cobain told Michael Azerrad, in the 1993 Nirvana biography, Come As You Are: The Story of Nirvana. "But I decided to write a song with that just to make [Grohl] feel better, to tell you the truth, and it turned out really cool." Cobain added the descending guitar riff played over the main riff and arranged the song, while Novoselic helped compose the song's second section. "I think most of the reason that song sounds good is because of the singing style and the guitar parts I do over the top of the basic rhythm," Cobain told Azerrad, "But hell, that was great." It is the only song on In Utero on which all three band members received songwriting credits.

The earliest known recording is an instrumental studio jam, recorded on October 6, 1992, featuring former Scratch Acid drummer Rey Washam on drums, along with Grohl on guitar and Novoselic on bass. The first recording featuring Cobain is a boombox-recorded rehearsal demo, over nine minutes long, that was released on the posthumous Nirvana box set, With the Lights Out, in 2004. 

"Scentless Apprentice" was first recorded in the studio by Craig Montgomery at BMG-Ariola studios in Rio de Janeiro, Brazil in January 1993. This demo version was closer in duration and structure to the finished version of the song, although it featured unfinished lyrics. The song was debuted live shortly before this version was recorded, on January 16, 1993 at the Hollywood Rock Festival in São Paulo, Brazil, and performed again shortly after, on January 23, 1993 at the Hollywood Rock Festival in Rio de Janeiro. Although the song's structure had been trimmed by that point, as evidenced by the studio version, the latter of these performances still developed into an extended jam that lasted nearly 20 minutes. During this performance, Cobain spat into the lenses of the TV cameras filming the show, and also exposed himself to one of the cameras, in a sequence that he referred to as "the penis and flower petal face in camera performance piece" in the posthumously released Journals. Footage of this part of the performance appears in the 1994 home video, Live! Tonight! Sold Out!!.

In Utero

The final studio version of "Scentless Apprentice" was recorded by Steve Albini in February 1993, at Pachyderm Studios in Cannon Falls, Minnesota. This version was released on the band's third and final studio album, In Utero, in September 1993. 

The song was recorded on February 13, the first day of the In Utero sessions, under the working title "Chuck Chuck Fo Fuck", a reference to the rhythm of the guitar riff. According to Albini, Cobain recorded two vocal takes for the song: one main vocal take, and a second "where Kurt was just singing parts of the song to emphasize them or parts of the song with a different sound quality."

Post-In Utero

The final live performance of "Scentless Apprentice" was at Nirvana's second-to-last show, at Hala Tivoli in Ljubljana, Slovenia on n February 27, 1994.

Composition

Music
"Scentless Apprentice" is a grunge and hard rock song that runs for a duration of three minutes and forty-eight seconds. According to the sheet music published at Musicnotes.com by BMG Rights Management, it is written in the time signature of common time, with a moderately fast rock tempo of 111 beats per minute. "Scentless Apprentice" is composed in the key of F Minor, while Cobain's vocal range spans one octave and four notes, from a low of B4 to a high of F5. The song has a basic sequence of F5–E5/C–F5–E5/C–F5–E5/C–F5 in the verses and F6–F7–Fmaj7–F during the refrain as its chord progression.

Lyrics

The song's lyrics are based on the 1985 novel Perfume by German writer Patrick Süskind, one of Cobain's favorite books. The novel is set in France in the eighteenth century and tells the story of an orphan who is born with two notable characteristics – he has an extraordinary sense of smell, but he himself gives off no body odor of any kind. He is reluctantly cared for at an orphanage by nurses who think he is devil-spawned but he eventually becomes an apprentice to a master perfume-maker and later commits a series of murders in order to make perfumes from the scents of his victims. Cobain had not originally intended to turn his reading of the book into a song, but the need for strong lyrics arose when the band collaborated in writing a song together from square one.

Release and reception
Cobain was pleased with the recording, telling Spin in a 1993 interview that the band wanted to release the song as the album's second single, following "Heart-Shaped Box." Ultimately, no single was ever released for the song before Cobain's death in April 1994, with "All Apologies" and "Rape Me" released as double A-sides as the album's second single instead. However, the song did receive some airplay on US album-oriented rock radio in 1993.

Albini was also impressed with the song, citing it and the In Utero track "Milk It" as "the two that struck me as the biggest step for the band," because they represented "the biggest break" from the band's more traditionally melodic material, and "the most adventurous sonically" songs on the album.

Legacy

In 2008, "Scentless Apprentice" was included in The Pitchfork 500, a book published by the online music publication Pitchfork  featuring their list of the "greatest songs" from 1977 to 2006. It was one of two Nirvana songs included in the book, along with the band's 1991 breakthrough single, "Smells Like Teen Spirit."

In 2015, Rolling Stone ranked "Scentless Apprentice" at number 24 in their list of the top 102 Nirvana songs. In a reader's poll conducted by Louder Sound in May 2018, "Scentless Apprentice" placed 23rd. In 2019, it was ranked at number 15 on The Guardian's Nirvana's 20 greatest songs list.

Accolades

Other releases

The demo recorded at  BMG-Ariola in Rio de Janeiro in January 1993 was released on the 20th anniversary "Deluxe" and "Super Deluxe" versions of In Utero in September 2013.

The In Utero version was re-released on the compilation CD Strung Out, released by Guitar World in a joint promotion with DGC in 1993. It also appeared on the promo cassette Concrete Music Bloc - Volume III, released by the heavy metal record label Concrete Corner in 1993.

The 20th anniversary "Deluxe" and "Super Deluxe" versions of In Utero also featured a 2013 remix of the song by Albini.

A live version, recorded at Pier 48 in Seattle on December 13, 1993, appeared on the live compilation, From the Muddy Banks of the Wishkah, in November 1996. An edited version of the show, including "Scentless Apprentice," was first aired on MTV on December 31, 1993, and the full show was released on the live video Live and Loud in September 2013

References

Bibliography

1993 songs
Music based on novels
Nirvana (band) songs
Songs written by Kurt Cobain
Songs written by Dave Grohl
Song recordings produced by Steve Albini